The Commodore 8050, Commodore 8250, and Commodore SFD-1001 are 5¼-inch floppy disk drives manufactured by Commodore International, primarily for its 8-bit CBM and PET series of computers.  The drives offered improved storage capacities over previous Commodore drive models.

Specifications 
All three models utilize 5¼-inch double-density floppy disks with a track spacing of 100 tracks-per-inch, for a total of 77 logical tracks per side.  Data is encoded using Commodore's proprietary group coded recording scheme.  Soft sectoring is used for track alignment.  Like most other Commodore disk drives, these drives utilize zone bit recording to maintain an average bit density across the entire disk.  Formatted capacity is approximately 0.5 megabyte per side, or 1 megabyte (1,066,496 bytes) in 4166 blocks total.

The 8050 is a single-sided drive, whereas the 8250 and SFD-1001 are dual-sided drives.  Dual-sided drives can fully read and write to disks formatted by single-sided drives, but single-sided drives can only read and write to the front side of disks formatted by dual-sided drives.

Both the 8050 and 8250 are housed in a dual-drive case similar to the Commodore 4040 drive.  The SFD-1001 is housed in a single-drive case similar to the Commodore 1541.  The 8250LP, a low-profile revision of the 8250, is housed in a shorter dual-drive case that is stylistically similar to the SFD-1001.  All models include an internal power supply and an IEEE-488 data connector on the rear of the case.  The 8050 and 8250 include latch sensors that can detect when a disk is inserted or removed.

These drives are not dual-mode, so they cannot read or write 5¼-inch disks formatted by lower-capacity 48-tpi models, such as the Commodore 1541 or 4040.  They also cannot read or write 5¼-inch disks formatted by 96-tpi drives, such as the 640 kilobyte IBM PC disk or 880 kilobyte Commodore Amiga disk, due to the minor difference in track spacing.  Lastly, they cannot read or write high-density 5¼-inch disks due to both the difference in track spacing and the difference in write head coercivity (300-oersted for double-density, 600-oersted for high-density).

Disk Layout 

Total Sectors: 2083 (4166 for the 8250)

The disk header is on 39/0 (track 39, sector 0), with the directory residing on the remaining 28 sectors of track 39.

Header Layout 39/0
 $00–01 T/S reference to the first BAM (block availability map) sector
     02 DOS version ('C')
  06-16 Disk label, $A0 padded
  18-19 Disk ID
  1B-1C DOS type('2C')

The BAM (block availability map) begins on 38/0 (track 38, sector 0), and continues on 38/3.  On the 8250, the BAM extends further to 38/6 and 38/9.  The remaining sectors on track 38 are available for general use.

BAM Layout 38/0, 3, (6, 9)
 $00–01 T/S reference to the next BAM sector, or 00/FF if last.
     02 DOS version ('C')
     04 Lowest BAM track in this block
     05 Highest+1 BAM track in this block
  06-FF BAM for 50 tracks

See also 
 List of floppy disk formats
 Zone bit recording
 Group coded recording

Notes

References

External links
 optusnet.com.au/../SFD1001.htm TOOLS specifically for the SFD1001 & 8250 Drives.
 Commodore Knowledge Base
 Technical comparison of Commodore floppy drives (with drive capacities)
 Commodore Dual Disk Drives
 Daves Old Computers - Commodore PET (floppy drive images and info)

CBM floppy disk drives